Laboe is a municipality in the district of Plön, in Schleswig-Holstein, Germany. It is situated on the Baltic Sea coast, approximately 10 km northeast of Kiel. The Laboe Naval Memorial is located within the municipality, as is the U-boat .

The city coat of arms depicts a swan and is based on its name, as Laboe means "swan" in the extinct Slavic Polabian language.

References

External links

  

Seaside resorts in Germany
Plön (district)